Hymeneliaceae is a family of lichen-forming fungi in the order Baeomycetales. It contains three genera and about 40 species. The family was circumscribed by German lichenologist Gustav Wilhelm Körber in 1855.

Lichens in the Hymeneliaceae are saxicolous (rock-dwelling) and crustose, occurring predominantly in the cool-temperate climates to subarctic climates of both the Northern and Southern hemispheres.

Genera
Hymenelia  – 26 spp.
Ionaspis  – 7 spp.
Tremolecia  – 6 spp.

References

Baeomycetales
Lecanoromycetes families
Lichen families
Taxa named by Gustav Wilhelm Körber
Taxa described in 1855